Christopher or Chris Elliott may refer to:

Christopher Haslett Elliott (born 1947), British Army officer (South Wales Borderers, Royal Regiment of Wales)
Christopher Leslie Elliott (born 1947), British Army officer (Royal Engineers)
Chris Elliott (born 1960), American comedian and actor
Chris Elliott (footballer) (born 1953), Australian rules footballer
Chris Elliott (food scientist), professor of food security at Queen's University Belfast
Chris Elliott (politician), American politician in Alabama

See also
Christy Elliott (1951–2011), Irish boxer
Christie Elliott (born 1991), English footballer 
Chris Elliot (disambiguation)